Exchange Square is civic square in Manchester, England. The square was created after the IRA 1996 Manchester bombing. This reconstruction included the structural relocation of two pubs to make room for the new Marks & Spencer store.

Today the square is a major shopping area including branches of high-end department stores Selfridges and Harvey Nichols, New Cathedral Street, the Corn Exchange and an entrance to the Manchester Arndale, one of the most-visited shopping centres in the United Kingdom.

To the north lies the Printworks and Urbis, now home to the National Football Museum. To the west lies Shambles Square (with The Old Wellington Inn) and Manchester Cathedral. To the south is New Cathedral Street and the Royal Exchange.

Transport

The square is served by Exchange Square tram stop on the Manchester Metrolink network which opened in December 2015. The station provides a direct link to Oldham, Shaw & Crompton and Rochdale. Construction on the extension started in 2014 and the entire Second City Crossing scheme was opened on 26 February 2017.

Wheel of Manchester

A transportable Ferris wheel was first installed at Exchange Square in 2004, known as the Wheel of Manchester. This was dismantled and a second wheel was erected in May 2007. A  wheel was planned for 2008 but never constructed. In 2010, Manchester City Council proposed a  wheel, to be operated by Great City Attractions, as a replacement for the existing transportable installation, which was installed at Piccadilly Gardens until 2015.

References

Squares in Manchester
Tourist attractions in Manchester